Roger Rasheed (born 10 March 1969) is a former Australian rules football player, tennis player, tennis coach and tennis commentator with the Seven Network for 12 years. Rasheed is best known as Grand Slam coach of Australian former World No. 1 Lleyton Hewitt, former World No. 6 Gaël Monfils, former World No. 5 Jo-Wilfried Tsonga, former World No. 3 Grigor Dimitrov and through his own website ProTennisCoach.com. In addition, Rasheed is a media personality on Channel Seven and is the founder of the Roger Rasheed Sports Foundation.

Career

Player
Prior to his work as a coach, Rasheed was the youngest ever player to qualify for an Australian Open in 1985 at 16 years of age, a feat eclipsed by Lleyton Hewitt, whom Rasheed later coached. Rasheed also competed in the ATP Challenger Series and won four titles in 1992. He reached number 192 in ATP rankings and number 132 in the doubles rankings in 1992.

Coaching
In Australia, Rasheed is notable as Lleyton Hewitt's coach from 2003 until 2007. During Rasheed's tenure as coach, Hewitt enjoyed significant domestic and international success, including becoming the first Australian in seventeen years to reach the Australian Open final and winning the 2006 Queen's Club Championships. Whilst Hewitt's coach, Rasheed also was the coach of the Australian Davis Cup team in 2006.

Rasheed then coached Gaël Monfils from July 2008 to July 2011 which coincided with Monfils rise in rankings from 38 to 7 in the ATP World Rankings. Since, Rasheed coached Frenchman and former Australian Open finalist Jo-Wilfried Tsonga between October 2012 and 2013. Tsonga achieved considerable success over this period, including defeating Roger Federer in straight sets at the French Open.

Since October 2013, Rasheed agreed to coach Bulgarian Grigor Dimitrov, the most successful Bulgarian male tennis player, both in financial and ranking terms, in history. Dimitrov credited Rasheed for his success in the 2014 Australian Open. Following a run of poor results in 2015, which culminated in a straight-sets defeat to Richard Gasquet at Wimbledon, Rasheed parted ways with Dimitrov.

ProTennisCoach.com
With Paul Annacone, Brad Gilbert and Darren Cahill, Rasheed developed ProTennisCoach.com — a professional and open coaching website launched in 2013.

Media
Rasheed regularly commentated both men's and women's matches in the Australian Open for the Seven Network between 2007 and 2018. In particular, Rasheed was known for his court-side commentary and special analysis.

He now works for the broadcaster Nine Network whilst working for the Tennis Australia world feed in an expert commentary role.

Foundation
In addition, Rasheed has launched the Roger Rasheed Sports Foundation a not for profit organisation which focuses on children's health across socioeconomic and geographic boundaries. Greg Norman is the Foundation's patron. The organisation's first project is developing the Rajah Street Community Reserve in the City of Marion, Adelaide.

Personal life
He is Australian of Lebanese descent. Born in Adelaide, Rasheed played Australian rules football, including seven games in the South Australian National Football League (SANFL) with the Sturt Football Club. He also tried to coach the Pembroke School football team. He is a keen supporter of the Port Adelaide Football Club in the Australian Football League (AFL).

Challenger finals

Doubles: 5 (4–1)

References

External links

 
 
 

1969 births
Living people
Australian male tennis players
Australian people of Lebanese descent
Sportspeople of Lebanese descent
Australian tennis coaches
Australian rules footballers from Adelaide
Tennis players from Adelaide
Sturt Football Club players
Australian tennis commentators
Australian rules footballers from South Australia